The Korean barrel drum is a shallow, barrel-shaped drum used in several types of Korean music, one of the many traditional Korean drums.
This variety of drum has a round wooden body that is covered on both ends with animal skin. They are categorized as hyekbu (혁부) which are instruments made with leather, and has been used for jeongak (Korean court music) and folk music.

History

The barrel drums used for court music are usually fixed with nails on the rims, while ones used for folk music are usually tied up with leather straps to form the shape. Performers in the court music usually beat these drums with a single drumstick (called bukchae, 북채) in one hand or two hands together, while drummers in the folk music commonly use a drumstick in their right hand while hitting the other side with their open left hand. In the past, the jong (종, bell) was also referred to as "soebuk" (쇠북, metal drum) and included in the drum category.

Barrel drums have been used for Korean music since the period of the Three Kingdoms of Korea (57 BC – 668 AD) in light of mural paintings in Anak Tomb of Goguryeo (37 BC – 668 AD) and records of Book of Sui on the kingdoms, Goguryeo and Baekje (18 BC – 660 AD). In the 3rd of Anak Tomb, two types are depicted in the paintings titled Juakdo (주악도, "painging of playing music") and Haengryeoldo (행렬도,  "painting of marching") such as ipgo (입고) and damgo (담고) respectively. The ipgo is a buk that performers beat as standing, while the damgo is a drum that drummers strike while carrying it on their shoulder.  

During the Unified Silla period (668 – 935), daego (대고) or  keunbuk, meaning "a big drum", was used along with a percussion instrument named bak (박) in music played by Samhyeon samjuk (삼현삼죽, 三絃三竹) which comprises samhyeon, three string instruments such as geomungo, gayageum, and hyangbipa and samjuk such as daegeum, junggeum and sogeum. In the Goryeo period (918 – 1392), as dangak and aak were introduced to Korea from China, a lot of drums such as janggu, gyobanggo, jingo began to be used for the court music.  

While there are twenty types of buk used in the present Korean traditional music, most commonly used buk are jwago to perform Samhyeon yukgak (삼현육각, 三絃六角), yonggo for marching music, gyobango for bukchum (북춤, drum dance), beopgo for Buddhist ritual ceremonies, sogo used by Namsadang, and street musicians, soribuk or called gojangbuk for pansori, maegubuk (or called nongakbuk) used for nongak, and motbanggo used by farmers as working.

Usages

There are two forms of undecorated buk used in Korean folk music: the buk used to accompany pansori, which has tacked heads, is called a sori-buk (소리북), while the buk used to accompany pungmul music, which has laced heads, is called pungmul-buk (풍물북).photo The sori-buk is played with both an open left hand and a stick made of birch that is held in the right hand, with the stick striking both the right drumhead and the wood of the drum's body. The pungmul-buk is one of the four instruments used in samul nori, a modern performance version of pungmul. It is played by striking a single stick (usually with the right hand) on only one of its heads.

Due to its similarity in shape and construction, the yonggo (hangul: 용고; hanja: 龍鼓; literally "dragon drum"), which is a barrel drum with tacked heads decorated with painted dragon designs and used in the military wind-and-percussion music called daechwita, is sometimes also classified as a form of buk. It is struck with two padded sticks.

A modern set of buk (usually four) is called modeum buk (모듬북).photo They are typically placed horizontally on wooden stands and played with sticks.photo

Gallery

See also
Traditional Korean musical instruments

References

The New Grove Dictionary of Music and Musicians, 2nd ed. S.v. "Puk," by Robert C. Provine.

Bibliography

 Samguk Sagi
 Goryeosa
 Book of Sui
 Akhak Gwebeom
 민요와 향토악기 (장사훈, 상문당, 1948)
 국악개요 (장사훈, 정연사, 1961)
 한국음악사전 (대한민국예술원, 1985)
 국악대사전 (장사훈, 세광음악출판사, 1984)

External links
Buk page from NCKTPA site

Video
Video showing sori-buk used in pansori
Video showing pungmul-buk used in samulnori
Video showing yonggo used in daechwita

Drums
Korean musical instruments

bg:Пък (музикален инструмент)